The 1975–76 NBA season was the Hawks' 27th season in the NBA and eighth season in Atlanta.

Offseason

Draft picks

Roster

Regular season

Season standings

z – clinched division title
y – clinched division title
x – clinched playoff spot

Record vs. opponents

References

Atlanta Hawks seasons
Atlanta
Atlanta
Atlanta